The Council of Sutri (or Synod of Sutri) was called by the Holy Roman Emperor Henry III and opened on December 20, 1046, in the hilltown of Sutri, at the edge of the Duchy of Rome. The Catholic Church does not list this as an ecumenical council.

The Annales Romani record the events thus:

The council was called to resolve disorder over the papacy. A faction in the church encouraged Henry III to intervene, both to resolve the conflict and to receive his crown from the pope in an official ceremony. In the autumn of 1046 Henry III, already King of the Germans, crossed the Alps at the head of a large army and accompanied by a retinue of the secular and ecclesiastical princes of the empire, all of whom were his sworn vassals. Henry had two intentions, to be crowned Holy Roman emperor by the pope at Rome and, in order that the pontiff concerned have an unassailable title—one that would not cast doubts upon his conferred imperial title— to establish order in the Duchy of Rome.

Rome was in a state of warfare between noble factions, each of whom had a candidate they regarded as pope. A pope presided at St. Peter's, another at the Lateran and a third at Saint Mary Major. Two of them, Benedict IX, a scion of the counts of Tusculum, and Sylvester III of the Crescenzi clan, represented rival factions of the Roman nobility. The claim of the third, Gregory VI, was peculiar in that he had purchased the title in good faith from Benedict IX two years previously. Each claimant had a number of supporters in the Roman church and held a portion of the city.

Henry was met by Gregory at Piacenza and was received with honor. It was decided that a synod should meet at Sutri, some 40 km north of Rome, well beyond the city's factional violence. Before the assembly Gregory testified that he had, "in all good faith and simplicity," purchased the papacy from Pope Benedict IX in 1044. After the departure of Benedict, the Bishop of Sabina had also declared himself pope, as Sylvester III. In 1045 Benedict, not having  received his pay-off, returned to Rome and renewed his claim to the papacy.

The council summoned the three pontiffs, and both Sylvester and Gregory attended. The claims of all three popes were quickly dismissed. Sylvester was stripped of his sacerdotal rank and exiled to a monastery. Gregory resigned (his words were recorded as: "I, Gregory, bishop, servant of the servants of God, do hereby adjudge myself to be removed from the pontificate of the Holy Roman Church, because of the enormous error which by simoniacal impurity has crept into and vitiated my election."), and the council ended on December 23. A form of the council was repeated in Rome the following day to oversee the dismissal of Benedict. The papacy was declared to be sede vacante.

On December 24–25 Henry turned first to the powerful Adalbert, Archbishop of Bremen, who refused the dangerous honor. Henry's next choice for the papacy was his personal confessor, Suidger, Bishop of his recently created See of Bamberg. Suidger became the new pope, taking the title Clement II, but insisting on retaining the See of Bamberg, which was a source of financial support beyond the reach of Roman factions. He was immediately enthroned on Christmas Day.

As his first pontifical act, Clement II placed the imperial crown upon his benefactor and the queen consort, Agnes, daughter of William V, Duke of Aquitaine. The new emperor received from the Romans and the pope the title and diadem of a Roman Patricius, a dignity with antecedents in the Late Empire, which since the tenth century had been assumed to confer the right to nominate the pontiff. Within a few decades the Gregorian Reforms would call this custom into question.

Benedict would again renew his claim to the papacy in 1047, when Clement II died.

Footnotes

References
Philip Schaff, History of the Christian Church: vol. iv
Catholic Encyclopedia
Engelbert, Pius, Heinrich III. und die Synoden von Sutri und Rom im Dezember 1046, in Römische Quartalschrift für christliche Altertumskunde und Kirchengeschichte, Vol. 94 (1999), pp 228–266

External links

Sutri
Sutri
11th century in the Papal States
1046 in Europe